Taj ol-Dowleh (died 1881) was the forty-second wife of Fath-Ali Shah Qajar and a poet. Her birth name was Tavus Khanum and she was of Georgian descent. She was born in Isfahan. 

She married Fath-Ali Shah in 1845 when she was 15 years old. The King changed the name of bejeweled Khorshid throne to Tavus throne on the occasion of this marriage. She was educated under the supervisor of Neshat Isfahani. After a while the King ordered to build a mansion for her because of his passionate love. Also a part of royal treasury was entrusted to her which was called the special treasury. Every Nowruz she used to invite the King along with his wives and married daughters to her mansion for thirteen days.

At the moment of the King's death, she was beside him in Isfahan and after that she took refuge to Mohammad Bagher Shafti from the princes' clashes for reign. After the enthronement of Mohammad Shah Qajar she donated all of her jewelry to him and went on a Hajj trip with her son, Seyf Al-Duleh. After some Hajj trips she went to Najaf and lived there until the end of her life. Her cemetery is in Imam Ali's apron.

She had six children: Sultan Mohammad Mirza Seyf Al-Duleh, Sultan Ahmad Mirza Azod Al-Duleh, Farokhsir Mirza Naier Al-Duleh, Shirinjan Khanum, Khorshid-Kolah Khanum Shams Al-Duleh (she was married to Mirza MohammadAli Khan Nezam Al-Duleh and her daughter, Shams ol-Molouk, married Aga Khan II) and Morasa Khanum.

References

People from Isfahan
Qajar royal consorts
Iranian people of Georgian descent
1881 deaths
Year of birth missing